Chambésy railway station is a railway station in the municipality of Pregny-Chambésy, in the Swiss canton of Geneva. It is an intermediate stop on the standard gauge Lausanne–Geneva line of Swiss Federal Railways.

Services 
The following services stop at Chambésy:

References

External links 
 
 

Railway stations in the canton of Geneva
Swiss Federal Railways stations